El Manantial is a corregimiento in Las Tablas District, Los Santos Province, Panama with a population of 909 as of 2010. Its population as of 1990 was 631; its population as of 2000 was 793.

References

Corregimientos of Los Santos Province